Bulbophyllum oblongum is a species of orchid in the genus Bulbophyllum and is found from India to Indochina.

References

The Bulbophyllum-Checklist
The Internet Orchid Species Photo Encyclopedia

oblongum